The 2012 ITU Triathlon Mixed Relay World Championship was held in Stockholm, Sweden on 26 August 2012. The championship was the seventh team championships to be held and the fourth since the championships were reformatted in 2009; eliminating the separate male and female teams, running the championships with mixed teams. The team championship event coincided on the same weekend as the 2012 ITU World Triathlon Series Stockholm race.

Each team was allowed to enter 2 teams of four, made up of 2 females and 2 males. The teams competed in the following order of female–male–female–male. Each athlete completed a 300-metre swim, a 6 kilometre bike ride and a 2 kilometre run.

Results
The ITU events in Stockholm were the first to occur since the Olympic games almost two weeks prior, with some Olympians who participated in 2011 team Championship choosing not to take part in this year's event. Twenty-two teams representing 20 countries began the competition. With the help of 2012 Olympic Triathlon bronze medalist Jonathan Brownlee, Great Britain was able to defend its 2011 Team Triathlon World Championship. The French team finished second, finishing ten seconds behind Britain. The Russian team came in 3rd to claim the bronze. The American team failed to finish after falling too far behind its competition.

References

External links
WTS Stockholm website

Team World Championships
2012 in Swedish sport
International sports competitions hosted by Sweden
Triathlon competitions in Sweden
Triathlon 2012